is a 1974 Japanese Science fiction film directed by Toshio Masuda. Based on Yasutaka Tsutsui's novel of the same title. Shōhei Hino made his film debut in the film.

Plot
Kinugawa Ryosuke transfused yakuza's blood when he was a child because of that blood transfusion he sometimes transforms into a super-human.

Cast
 Shōhei Hino as Kinugawa Ryosuke
 Frankie Sakai as Rokosuke Sawamura 
 Toru Abe as Toraichiro Yamaga 
 Etsuko Nanmi
 Wataru Nachi
 Hosei Komatsu
 Ichirō Nakatani as Itami

References

External links

1974 films
1970s Japanese-language films
1970s Japanese films